Donta railway station is a railway station on Indore–Gwalior line under the Ratlam railway division of Western Railway zone. This is situated at Derawan, Donta in Shajapur district of the Indian state of Madhya Pradesh.

References

Railway stations in Shajapur district
Ratlam railway division